Baglan may refer to:

Places

India
 Baglan Kingdom, a small local principality that existed between (1308-1619), in west-central India
 Baglan Taluka, a tehsil in Nashik District, Maharashtra State

Turkey
 Bağlan, Lice

Wales
Baglan, Neath Port Talbot, a village in Neath Port Talbot County Borough
Baglan (electoral ward), local government electoral area in Neath Port Talbot County Borough
Baglan Bay, part of Swansea Bay

People
Saint Baglan, a Welsh saint

See also
 Baghlan a city in Afghanistan
 Baghlan Province a province in north-central Afghanistan
 Baghlan District a district of Baghlan Province, Afghanistan
 Baghlani Jadid District a district of Baghlan Province, Afghanistan
 Baghlani Jadid city and capital of Baghlani Jadid District, Afghanistan